The 2005 Grand Prix de Futsal, also known as the Grand Prix das Américas 2005, was the inaugural edition of the international futsal competition of the same kind as the FIFA Futsal World Cup but with invited nations and held annually in Brazil.

Venue
Brusque/Santa Catarina (BRA)

Teams

Group A

Group B

First round

Group A Standings

Group B Standings

Final round

Classification 5th–6th

Classification 1st–4th

5th/6th place match

Semifinals

3rd/4th place match

Final

References

Grand Prix de Futsal
Grand Prix de Futsal
Grand Prix De Futsal, 2005